Shewanella is the sole genus included in the marine bacteria family Shewanellaceae. Some species within it were formerly classed as Alteromonas. Shewanella consists of facultatively anaerobic Gram-negative rods, most of which are found in extreme aquatic habitats where the temperature is very low and the pressure is very high. Shewanella bacteria are a normal component of the surface flora of fish and are implicated in fish spoilage. Shewanella chilikensis, a species of the genus Shewanella commonly found in the marine sponges of Saint Martin's Island of the Bay of Bengal, Bangladesh.

Shewanella oneidensis MR-1 is a widely used laboratory model to study anaerobic respiration of metals and other anaerobic extracellular electron acceptors, and for teaching about microbial electrogenesis and microbial fuel cells.

Biochemical characteristics of Shewanella species 
Colony, morphological, physiological, and biochemical characteristics of Shewanella species are shown in the Table below.

Note: + = Positive; – =Negative

Metabolism
Currently known Shewanella species are heterotrophic facultative anaerobes. In the absence of oxygen, members of this genus possess capabilities allowing the use of a variety of other electron acceptors for respiration. These include thiosulfate, sulfite, or elemental sulfur, as well as fumarate. Marine species have demonstrated an ability to use arsenic as an electron acceptor as well. Some members of this species, most notably Shewanella oneidensis, have the ability to respire through a wide range of metal species, including manganese, chromium, uranium, and iron.
Reduction of iron and manganese through Shewanella respiration has been shown to involve extracellular electron transfer through the employment of bacterial nanowires, extensions of the outer membrane.

Applications
The discovery of some of the respiratory capabilities possessed by members of this genus has opened the door to possible applications for these bacteria. The metal-reducing capabilities can potentially be applied to bioremediation of uranium-contaminated groundwater, 
with the reduced form of uranium produced being easier to remove from water than the more soluble uranium oxide. Scientists researching the creation of microbial fuel cells, designs that use bacteria to induce a current, have also made use of the metal reducing capabilities some species of Shewanella possess as a part of their metabolic repertoire.

Significance 
One of the roles that the genus Shewanella has in the environment is bioremediation. Shewanella species have great metabolic versatility; they can reduce various electron acceptors. Some of the electron acceptors they use are toxic substances and heavy metals, which often become less toxic after being reduced. Examples of metals that Shewanella are capable of reducing and degrading include uranium, chromium, and iron. Its ability to decrease toxicity of various substances makes Shewanella a useful tool for bioremediation. Specifically, Shewanella oneidensis strain MR-1 is often used to clean up contaminated nuclear weapon manufacturing sites.

Shewanella also contributes to the biogeochemical circulation of minerals. Members of this genus are widely distributed in aquatic habitats, from the deep sea to the shallow Antarctic Ocean. Its diverse habitats, coupled to its ability to reduce a variety of metals, makes the genus critical for the cycling of minerals. For instance, under aerobic conditions, various species of Shewanellaare capable of oxidizing manganese. When conditions are changed, the same species can reduce the manganese oxide products. Hence, since Shewanella can both oxidize and reduce manganese, it is critical to the cycling of manganese.

See also 
 Shewanella haliotis

References

External links
 List of bacterial genera named after personal names
Shewanella Genome Projects (from Genomes OnLine Database)
Comparative Analysis of Shewanella Genomes (at DOE's IMG system)

Alteromonadales
Bacteria genera